Nordfold is a village in Steigen Municipality in Nordland county, Norway. The village of Nordfold lies along the Nordfolda, a northern branch of the main Folda fjord. It is the location of the Nordfold Church.

History
The village was the administrative centre of the old municipality of Nordfold which existed from 1906 until 1964.  Prior to the opening of the Steigen Tunnel in 1990, there was no road access to the municipality and Nordfold was the ferry quay for the regular ferry routes connecting Steigen to the rest of the country.

References

Villages in Nordland
Steigen
Populated places of Arctic Norway